The Seventh Ward is a neighborhood of the city of New Orleans.  A sub-district of the Mid-City District Area, its boundaries as defined by the New Orleans City Planning Commission are: A.P. Tureaud Avenue, Agriculture, Allen, Industry, St. Anthony, Duels, Frenchmen and Hope Streets to the north, Elysian Fields Avenue to the east, St. Claude and St. Bernard Avenues, North Rampart Street and Esplanade Avenue to the south, and North Broad Street to the west.

Geography

Adjacent neighborhoods
 St. Roch (north & east)
 Marigny (south)
 Tremé (south)
 Fairgrounds (west)

Boundaries

The New Orleans City Planning Commission defines the boundaries of Seventh Ward as these streets: A.P. Tureaud Avenue, Annette Street, Agriculture Street, Allen Street, Industry Street, St. Anthony Avenue, Duels Street, Frenchmen Street, Hope Street, Elysian Fields Avenue, St. Claude Avenue, St. Bernard Avenue, North Rampart Street, Esplanade Avenue and North Broad Street.

Demographics
As of the census of 2000, there were 16,955 people, 6,489 households, and 3,965 families living in the neighborhood.  The population density was 14,616 /mi² (5,652 /km). Historically, most of the inhabitants of New Orleans who are of Creole descent, were born in the Seventh Ward.

As of the census of 2010, there were 10,187 people, 4,248 households, and 2,356 families living in the neighborhood.

Education
Orleans Parish School Board is the designated school district of New Orleans.

New Orleans Public Library will open the new Nora Navra Branch in the 7th Ward in 2017. Hurricane Katrina had damaged the previous facility in 2005. The Federal Emergency Management Agency (FEMA) was to pay for the costs of demolition of the previous library and construction of the new library since the previous facility had been, according to FEMA's estimation, over 50% damaged by Katrina. The features and amenities present in the new facility that were not in the previous facility were financed by other sources, including New Orleans municipal bond sales and funds from the Louisiana Recovery Authority. The "design-build" process, one specially allowed only in parishes affected by Hurricane Katrina under Louisiana law, was used to rebuild this library and four others. Two architectural firms, the New Orleans company Lee Ledbetter & Associates and the Kansas City, Missouri company Gould Evans Associates, were hired to design this library and four others. They were designed to have better access to public transportation and have reduced utility usage, including having electricity and water-saving features, in order to be more cost effective.

See also
 Neighborhoods in New Orleans
 Wards of New Orleans
 Dillard University
 Henry Braden and political organization COUP

External links
 Greater New Orleans Community Data Center, Seventh Ward Community Snapshot, pre-Katrina

References

Neighborhoods in New Orleans
Wards of New Orleans